Bernhard Bischoff (20 December 1906 – 17 September 1991) was a German historian, paleographer, and philologist; he was born in Altendorf (administrative division of Altenburg, Thuringia), and he died in Munich.

Biography 
He was the son of Emil Bischoff and Charlotte von Gersdorff, who died giving birth to him. He received a Pietistic education during his youth. He married Hanne Oehler in 1935 and lived the majority of his life in Bavaria outside of academia. He would work on this achievement until 1972, cataloging Latin manuscripts of the 9th century. He began to teach at the University of Munich in 1947, receiving the Chair of Medieval Latin Philology under his instructor, Lehmann, succeeding Ludwig Traube. In 1974 he became emeritus.

In the last years of his life, he worked on cataloging nearly 7,000 9th-century medieval Latin manuscripts, published by the Bavarian Academy of Sciences.
 
Bischoff was most influential in the field of paleography, specifically in his expertise in dating and localizing medieval manuscripts.  His work on the subject, Latin Paleography: Antiquity and the Western Middle Ages, is a fundamental work for the discipline.  It has been translated into English by Daíbí Ó Cróinín and David Ganz, and into French by Jean Vezin and Harmut Atsma. Bischoff received four degrees honoris causa at the Universities of Dublin (1962), Oxford (1963), Cambridge, and Milan. He was a member of the Bavarian Academy of Sciences (1956), of the Royal Irish Academy (1957), of the Medieval Academy of America (1960), German Archeological Institute (1962), the American Academy of Arts and Sciences (1968), and the American Philosophical Society (1989).

Principal Works 

 The Southeast Writing Schools and Libraries in the Carolingian Era, Part I: The Bavarian Dioceses. Leipzig 1940 (Second edit.) Wiesbaden 1960 3rd edit. (Wiesbaden 1974); Part II: The Predominantly Austrian Dioceses, Wiesbaden 1980.
 Medieval Studies: Selected Articles on the Font Customer and Literary History, 3 Vols. Hiersemann, Stuttgart, 1966–1981. 
 Catalogue of the Continental Manuscripts of the Ninth Century (with the exception of the Visigothic & publications of the Commission for the Publication of the German and Swiss Medieval Library Catalogues, Part 1: Aachen – Lambach..
 Catalogue of the Continental Manuscripts of the Ninth Century (with the exception of the Visigothic (Edition by Birgit Ebersperger (Publications of the Commission for the Publication of the German and Swiss Medieval Library Catalogues/ published by the Bavarian Academy of Sciences). Part 2. Laon – Manuscripts and libraries in the Age of Charlemagne, Tradition and Edit. By Paderborn. Harrassowitz, Wiesbaden 2004. (ISBN 3-447 -04750-X).
 Manuscripts and Libraries in the Age of Charlemagne, Tradition & Edition by Michael Gorman (Cambridge Studies in Paleography and Codicology 1), Cambridge University Press: Cambridge 1994, Recension.
 Paleography of Roman Antiquity and of the Western Middle Ages. 3rd Edition. Berlin 2004. (Basics of the German language and literature 24)..

References

Notes

Bibliography 
 François Chamoux, Allocution à l'occasion du décès de M. Bernard Bischoff, associé étranger de l'Académie, Comptes-rendus des séances de l'année... - Académie des inscriptions et belles-lettres, 135e année, N. 3, 1991, p. 51.
 Heinrich Fichtenau, Bernhard Bischoff †, Almanach der Österreichischen Akademie der Wissenschaften, 1991/92, 142 année, (Wien 1992), pp. 505–510.
 Horst Fuhrmann, Bernhard Bischoff, Menschen und Meriten. Eine persönliche Portraitgalerie, C. H. Beck: München 2001, pp. 300–310.
 Sigrid Krämer, Bibliographie Bernhard Bischoff und Verzeichnis aller von ihm herangezogenen Handschriften (Fuldaer Hochschulschriften 27), Knecht: Frankfurt am Main 1998,. Recension
 Sigrid Krämer: Bernhard Bischoff zum 100. Geburtstag, Akademie aktuell – Zeitschrift der Bayerischen Akademie der Wissenschaften, Heft 20, 01/2007, pp. 56–58, ISSN 1436-753X
 Gabriel Silagi: Bernhard Bischoff, Deutsches Archiv für Erforschung des Mittelalters, 48 (1992), pp. 411–413.
 Notice du Catalogue général de la BnF
 Photographie et biographie en allemand
 page des Monumenta Germaniae Historica

1906 births
1991 deaths
20th-century philologists
German antiquarians
German classical philologists
German Latinists
German male non-fiction writers
German medievalists
German palaeographers
German philologists
People from Altenburg
Corresponding Fellows of the Medieval Academy of America
Recipients of the Pour le Mérite (civil class)
Knights Commander of the Order of Merit of the Federal Republic of Germany
Corresponding Fellows of the British Academy
20th-century antiquarians
Members of the American Philosophical Society